Shih Yen-shiang (born 24 March 1950) is a Taiwanese politician. He was the Minister of Economic Affairs from 2009 to 2013.

References

1950 births
Living people
Massachusetts Institute of Technology alumni
National Taiwan University alumni
Taiwanese Ministers of Economic Affairs